Delevea bertrandi is a species of myxophagan beetles in the genus Delevea.

References

Myxophaga
Beetles described in 1976